Bidhand (also Romanized as Bīdhand and Bīd Hend) is a village in Kahak Rural District, Kahak District, Qom County, Qom Province, Iran. At the 2006 census, its population was 933, in 280 families.

References 

Populated places in Qom Province